Peirce Middle School may refer to:
 Cyrus Peirce Middle School, Nantucket Public Schools, Massachusetts
 E. N. Peirce Middle school, West Chester Area School District, Pennsylvania

See also
 Pierce Middle School (disambiguation)